Jabrun is a settlement in Guadeloupe in the commune of Morne-à-l'Eau, on the island of Grande-Terre.  Chazeau, Malignon, and Jabrun-du-Sud are to the west.

Populated places in Guadeloupe